Richard Leigh (c. 1557 – 1588) was an English Roman Catholic martyr born in Cambridge, the scion of Cheshire gentry, squires of the West Hall, High Legh since the 11th century.

Life 

Richard Leigh was the son of Richard Leigh, who attended Cambridge University, and Clemence Holcroft, daughter of Sir John Holcroft. He was the subject of a childhood arranged marriage at Middleton, 22 September 1562 with Anne Belfield (married in 1574 William Assheton, steward of the manor of Rochdale), daughter of Ralph Belfield, of Clegg Hall, who had died without a male heir in 1552. Her sister, Elizabeth, was married on the same day to Alexander Barlow (later Sir Alexander Barlow) and both marriages were subsequently annulled on the grounds of being so young that "doth not remember that he ever was marryed."

Leigh attended Shrewsbury School before studying divinity at Reims and at Rome, where he was ordained in 1586. He returned to England but before reaching Cheshire, was arrested in London and banished. He returned to England again and was arrested on 4 July 1588, about two weeks before the arrival of the Spanish Armada. In the aftermath of the failed invasion, there was an immediate reaction against Catholics.

Imprisoned in the Tower of London, he was condemned at the Old Bailey for being a priest and hanged at Tyburn on 30 August 1588, with five others who have been declared Venerable: Richard Martin, John Roche, Edward Shelley, Richard Lloyd (alias Flower) and Margaret Ward. Leigh was beatified by Pope Pius XI in 1929.

Richard Flower
The individual commonly known as Richard Flower was born Richard Lloyd, probably around 1566, to a notable family of Anglesey. He also went under the names Fludd and Graye. By 1584, he is mentioned in government interrogation reports as "the chiefest reliever of priests". The law at that time declared that anyone who knowingly "shall receive, relieve, aid, or comfort a Seminary priest, are felons..." Lloyd was accused of providing aid to a priest named William Horner, in the parish of St. Dunstan's, Farringdon Without. According to Christopher Grene, Lloyd gave Horner, alias Forest, a quart of wine. Grene says that since at the time of Lloyd's trial, Horner was only a supposed priest, being neither under arrest, condemned, nor outlawed, the court was unsure if he even was a priest. Lloyd was executed at Tyburn 30 August 1588, at about twenty-two years of age.

See also 
 List of Catholic martyrs of the English Reformation

References

External links
Bl. Richard Leigh Catholic Online article

1550s births
1588 deaths
People from Cambridge
People from Cheshire
People educated at Shrewsbury School
Reims University (1548–1793) alumni
16th-century English Roman Catholic priests
16th-century Roman Catholic martyrs
English beatified people
Martyred Roman Catholic priests
Executed Roman Catholic priests
16th-century venerated Christians
People executed under Elizabeth I
Executed English people
People executed by Tudor England by decapitation
People executed at Tyburn
One Hundred and Seven Martyrs of England and Wales